The Acton Society Trust was established by the Joseph Rowntree Social Service Trust in the 1940s "to analyse the implications of the welfare state for liberty and the individual.

It paid for assistants to front bench politicians, now known as special political advisors, who were referred to as Chocolate Soldiers, until public money was provided for the purpose in 1974.  It produced many of the earliest studies of management in the United Kingdom, particularly in the National Health Service.

It submitted evidence to the Committee on the Staffing of Local Government (Mallaby Committee) in 1966.
 
Directors of the organisation included Rosemary Stewart. Teddy Chester and Reg Revans both worked for the trust before moving to the University of Manchester, as did David Layton. 

The Trust's archives are held at the London School of Economics.

It was closed down in 2000.

Publications
 Nationalised Industry: 1, Accountability to Parliament, 1950
 Nationalised Industry: 2, The Powers of the Minister, 1950
 Accountability to Parliament, 1950
 The extent of centralisation: A discussion based on a case study in the coal industry (Nationalised industry series; nos. 6 & 7), 1951 
 Training and promotion in nationalised industry, 1951
 Problems of Promotion Policy, 1951
 The Powers of the Minister, 1951
 The Miner's Pension, 1951
 The Men on the Boards. A Study of the Composition of the Boards of the Nationalised Industry, 1951
 The Framework of Joint Consultation, 1952
 The Workers Point of View. A Discussion of "Reporting Back" Based on a Study in a Coalfield, (Studies in nationalised industry series;no.11), 1952
 Patterns of Organisation, 1952
 The Future of the Unions, 1952
 Relations with the Public, 1952
 Management Under Nationalisation: Studies in Decentralisation, (prepared by T. E. Chester and J. H. Smith), 1953
 Background and blueprint: Hospital organisation and administration under the National Health Service (Hospitals and the State series; no.1), 1955
 Management succession: The recruitment, selection, training and promotion of managers, 1956
 The impact of the change: Hospital organisation and administration under the National Health Service (Hospitals and the state series;no.2),1956
 Groups, regions and committees: Hospital organisation and administration under the National Health Service (Hospitals and the state series; nos 3 and 4) 1957
 Creative leadership in a state service: A general survey (Hospitals and the state series)
 Size and morale, 1957
 The central control of the service (Hospitals and the state series;no.3), 1958
 Redundancy: A survey of problems and practices, 1958
 Wider shareholding, 1959
 Creative leadership in a state service: A general survey (Hospitals and the state series;no.6), 1959
 Retirement: A study of current attitudes and practices, 1960
 Management initiative, A report compiled by M. J. Kirton and others, 1961
 Buying better health – Colloquium on the Finance of National Health, 1961 
 Childers Sort Out the Mixers (Case studies of management initiative), 1962
 The Reorganization of Childers Sales Methods (Case studies of management initiative), 1962
 The Childers Rosette Scheme (Case studies of management initiative), 1962
 No Sale for Childers Dryers (Case studies of management initiative), 1962
 Brent & Russell Buy a Subsidiary (Case studies of management initiative),1962
 The arts graduate in industry, 1962
 Mergers past and present, Randall Smith, 1963
 The human effects of mergers: the impact on managers; Rosemary Stewart, Pauline Wingate and Randal Smith, 1963
 Industry and the countryside: The impact of industry on amenities in the countryside:the report of a preliminary inquiry for the Royal Society of Arts 1963
 Land values: The report of the proceedings of a colloquium held in London on March 13 and 14, 1965 under the auspices of the Acton Society Trust, 1965
 Regionalism in England, 1965
 Town and county hall problems of recruitment and training by Trevor Smith, 1966
 The human effects of mergers: the impact on the shop floor, Dennis Brooks and Randall Smith, 1966
 Its Aims Work and Publications, 1967
 Sharing The Profits. An Inquiry Into The Habits, attitudes and Problems of Employees' Shareholding Schemes; Mr. Guy Naylor, 1968
 Acton essays, 1968
 Acton Society Studies. no. 1, etc, 1972
 Readings on Mergers and Takeovers, 1972, 
 A Study of Liberty and Revolution, Goodman, Edward; 1975 
 What size should organisations be? Peter Abell, 1977
 How the economies of scale might benefit small units of spontaneous cooperation, E. Goodman, 1977
 Thoughts on the present discontents in Britain: a review and a proposal, Krishan Kumar, 1977
 Some relative efficiency and comparative institutional properties of markets and hierarchies, David J. Teece, 1977
 Hierarchy and democratic authority, Peter Abell, 1978
 Economic efficiency and the internal structure of the business enterprise: theory and evidence, Henry Ogden Armour and David J. Teece, 1978
 The concept of property; Iain Hampsher-Monk, 1978
 Information technology and the size of firms, R. K. Stamper, 1978
 Some reflections on information economics, Joseph E. Stiglitz, 1978 
 Information and economic organisation , Joseph E. Stiglitz, 1978
 The contribution of small units of enterprise to the German economic miracle, Willibrord Sauer, 1979
 What welcome? reception and resettlement of refugees in Britain, Michael Levin, 1981 
 The Scottish Office and nationalised industries, James F. Laing, 1982 
 British politics in the post-Keynesian era, Trevor Smith, 1986 
 Impacts And Influences; James Curran, Anthony Smith and Pauline Wingate, 1987,

References

Think tanks based in the United Kingdom